A cryptocurrency wallet is a device, physical medium, program or a service which stores the public and/or private keys for cryptocurrency transactions. In addition to this basic function of storing the keys, a cryptocurrency wallet more often also offers the functionality of encrypting and/or signing information. Signing can for example result in executing a smart contract, a cryptocurrency transaction (see "bitcoin transaction" image), identification or legally signing a 'document' (see "application form" image).

History 
In 2008 bitcoin was introduced as the first cryptocurrency which was outlined in Satoshi Nakamoto principle described in paper “Bitcoin: A Peer-to-Peer Electronic Cash System.” Project was described as an electronic payment system using cryptographic proof instead of trust. Mentioned cryptographic proof utilizes transactions which are verified and recorded on a blockchain.

In the beginning of 2022, 60 major crypto exchanges were generating trading volume higher than USD 100 billion according to Forbes.

In March 2022, about 600 crypto exchanges worldwide offered digital assets trading. Among the largest companies are Coinbase, Kraken, eToro, Robinhood, Crypto.com, Binance, Huobi, Gemini, GMO Coin.

Technology

Private and public key generation 
A cryptocurrency wallet works by a theoretical or random number being generated and used with a length that depends on the algorithm size of the cryptocurrency's technology requirements. The number is then converted to a private key using the specific requirements of the cryptocurrency cryptography algorithm requirement. A public key is then generated from the private key using whichever cryptographic algorithm requirements are required. The private key is utilised by the owner to access and send cryptocurrency and is private to the owner, whereas the public key is to be shared to any third party to receive cryptocurrency.

Up to this stage no computer or electronic device is required and all key pairs can be mathematically derived and written down by hand. The private key and public key pair (known as an address) are not known by the blockchain or anyone else. The blockchain will only record the transaction of the public address when cryptocurrency is sent to it, thus recording in the blockchain ledger the transaction of the public address.

Duplicate private keys 
Collision (two or more wallets having the same private key) is theoretically possible, since keys can be generated without being used for transactions, and are therefore offline until recorded in the blockchain ledger. However, this possibility is negated because the theoretical probability of two or more private keys being the same is extremely low. The number of possible wallets and thus private keys is extremely high, so duplicating or hacking a certain key would be inconceivable.

Seed phrases 
In modern convention a seed phrase is now utilised which is a random 12 to 24 (or even greater) list of dictionary words which is an unencrypted form of the private key. (Words are easier to memorize than numerals.) When online, exchange and hardware wallets are generated using random numbers, and a seed phrase is asked to be recorded by the user, hence when access to the wallet becomes misplaced, damaged or compromised, the seed phrase can be used to re-access the wallet and associated keys and cryptocurrency in toto.

Wallets 
A number of technologies known as wallets exist that store the key value pair of private and public key known as wallets. A wallet hosts the details of the key pair making transacting cryptocurrency possible. Multiple methods exist for storing keys or seeds in a wallet.

A brainwallet or brain wallet is a type of wallet in which one memorizes a passcode (a private key or seed phrase). Brainwallets may be attractive due to plausible deniability or protection against governmental seizure, but are vulnerable to password guessing (especially large-scale offline guessing). Several hundred brainwallets exist on the Bitcoin blockchain, but most of them have been drained, sometimes repeatedly.

Crypto wallets vis-à-vis dapp browsers 
Dapp browsers are specialized software that supports decentralized applications. Dapp browsers are considered to be the browsers of Web3 and are the gateway to access the decentralized applications which are working based on blockchain technology. That means all dapp browsers must have a unique code system to unify all the different codes of the dapps.

While crypto wallets are focused on the exchange, purchase, sale of digital assets and support narrowly targeted applications, the browsers support different kinds of applications of various formats, including exchange, games, NFTs marketplaces, etc. 

Technical specifications of different browsers may or may not include features such as:

Full support for all modern Web2.0 technologies;
Built-in Ethereum mainnet/testnet RPC, fully compatible with Web3.0;
Built-in Ethereum wallet (using smart contracts);
 Dapp naming support

Characteristics 
In addition to the basic function of storing the keys, a cryptocurrency wallet may also have one or more of the following characteristics.

Simple cryptocurrency wallet

A simple cryptocurrency wallet contains pairs of public and private cryptographic keys. The keys can be used to track ownership, receive or spend cryptocurrencies. A public key allows others to make payments to the address derived from it, whereas a private key enables the spending of cryptocurrency from that address.

The cryptocurrency itself is not in the wallet. In the case of bitcoin and cryptocurrencies derived from it, the cryptocurrency is decentrally stored and maintained in a publicly available distributed ledger called the blockchain.

eID wallet

Some wallets are specifically designed to be compatible with a framework. The European Union is creating an eIDAS compatible European Self-Sovereign Identity Framework (ESSIF) which runs on the European Blockchain Services Infrastructure (EBSI). The EBSI wallet is designed to (securely) provide information, an eID and to sign 'transactions'.

Multisignature wallet
In contrast to simple cryptocurrency wallets requiring just one party to sign a transaction, multisignature wallets require multiple parties to sign a transaction. Multisignature wallets are designed for increased security. Usually, a multisignature algorithm produces a joint signature that is more compact than a collection of distinct signatures from all users.

Smart contract
In the cryptocurrency space, smart contracts are digitally signed in the same way a cryptocurrency transaction is signed. The signing keys are held in a cryptocurrency wallet.

Key derivation

Sequential deterministic wallet

A sequential deterministic wallet utilizes a simple method of generating addresses from a known starting string or "seed". This would utilize a cryptographic hash function, e.g. SHA-256 (seed + n), where n is an ASCII-coded number that starts from 1 and increments as additional keys are needed.

Hierarchical deterministic wallet
The hierarchical deterministic (HD) wallet was publicly described in BIP32. As a deterministic wallet, it also derives keys from a single master root seed, but instead of having a single "chain" of keypairs, an HD wallet supports multiple key pair chains. 

This allows a single key string to be used to generate an entire tree of key pairs with a stratified structure.

BIP39 proposed the use of a set of human-readable words to derive the master private key of a wallet. This mnemonic phrase allows for easier wallet backup and recovery, due to all the keys of a wallet being derivable from a single plaintext string.

Armory deterministic wallet
Bitcoin Armory, an open source, Python-based, wallet-management application for the Bitcoin network, utilized its own implementation the hierarchical deterministic scheme and served as inspiration for the BIP32 standard.

Non-deterministic wallet
In a non-deterministic wallet, each key is randomly generated on its own accord, and they are not seeded from a common key. Therefore, any backups of the wallet must store each and every single private key used as an address, as well as a buffer of 100 or so future keys that may have already been given out as addresses but not received payments yet.

Concerns

Wallet access permissions 
When choosing a wallet, the owner must keep in mind who is supposed to have access to (a copy of) the private keys and thus potentially has signing capabilities. In case of cryptocurrency the user needs to trust the provider to keep the cryptocurrency safe, just like with a bank. Trust was misplaced in the case of the Mt. Gox exchange, which 'lost' most of their clients' bitcoins. Downloading a cryptocurrency wallet from a wallet provider to a computer or phone does not automatically mean that the owner is the only one who has a copy of the private keys. For example, with Coinbase, it is possible to install a wallet on a phone and to also have access to the same wallet through their website.

Vulnerabilities 
A wallet can also have known or unknown vulnerabilities. A supply chain attack or side-channel attack are ways of a vulnerability introduction. In extreme cases even a computer which is not connected to any network can be hacked. 

When using a software wallet for receiving cryptocurrency, access to the receiving wallet is not needed—the sending party only need know the destination address, thus anyone can send cryptocurrency to an address. Only the one who has the private key of the corresponding (public key) address otherwise has access.

See also
 Cryptocurrency
 Cryptocurrency exchange
 Bitcoin
 Cryptography
Cryptocurrency and security
Private and Public key cryptography
 Mobile payment
 Digital gold currency

References 

Bitcoin
Wallet
Private currencies
Digital currency exchanges